The Television Personalities are an English post-punk band formed in 1977 by London singer-songwriter Dan Treacy. Their varied, volatile and long career encompasses post punk, neo-psychedelia and indie pop; the only constant being Treacy's songwriting. Present and former members include Chelsea childhood mates 'Slaughter Joe' Joe Foster, one time best friend Ed Ball (early line-up, later briefly) and Jowe Head (ex-Swell Maps), with Jeffrey Bloom from 1983-94. The threesome of Treacy, Head, and Bloom formed the longest unchanged line-up and as a result is considered by many to be the definitive line-up, performing hundreds of gigs around the world and recording many of the band's most popular songs like "How I Learned to Love the Bomb", "Salvador Dali's Garden Party" and "Strangely Beautiful". Despite this, the Television Personalities are best known for their early single "Part Time Punks", a favourite of John Peel's.

Despite their relatively minor commercial success (their third album was sardonically titled They Could Have Been Bigger than the Beatles), the Television Personalities are highly regarded by critics and have been widely influential, especially on the C86 generation, on many of the bands signed to Creation Records in the 1990s, and on American artists such as Pavement and MGMT. Treacy's unconventional but dryly witty and culture infused lyrics, have led to his reputation as a seminal and iconic figure within the independent music scene.

In 2006 music critic Cam Lindsay described Treacy as having "recorded some of the most bizarre, unlistenable and brilliant pop songs in the last three decades".

Career

Formation
Treacy was inspired to form the Television Personalities after hearing the Sex Pistols and Jonathan Richman. Ever unconventional, Treacy said he was not that much interested in music and the band rarely rehearsed. Treacy did not prepare set-lists for live performances, preferring to keep the band on their toes. Head remembers "us rehearsing once in late 1983. We did another one five years later, and that was about it." The band struggled to find a name, and early suggestions included the names of mainstream and often ridiculed television hosts such as Nicholas Parsons, Russell Harty, Bruce Forsyth and Hughie Green, before they decided on the more generic and pointed "Television Personalities".

Their first single "14th Floor" was released in January 1978 to critical acclaim. It was followed by the 1978 EP Where's Bill Grundy Now? which brought them to popular attention. The EP features their lone chart hit, the seminal "Part Time Punks", written while Treacy was 17 years and living in a high-rise building on King's Road. [Edward] Ball was amazed at the quality of Treacy's writing, and admitted that he "couldn't believe the lyrics. Suddenly, my best friend was coming out with these amazing songs." With the financial backing of his mother, Treacy hand-pressed 500 copies of "'Where's Bill Grundy Now?", each with a photocopied sleeve, which he sent to various record companies and radio DJs. The track was picked up by BBC's John Peel. Treacy said "Peel loved it, but my mum was hassling me to pay back the money."

The song title and resulting media attention brought the band to the notice of the music press and rock establishment royalty they were parodying. Treacy said: "Jimmy Page came in one day when I was reading an interview I'd done, and I told him I had a record out. So then, he walks me upstairs to a wardrobe brimming with guitars, hands me one and five minutes later, I was jamming with Jimmy Page. He was good, but he weren't as good as me." Later the promotion of the "14th Floor" single was supported by Joe Strummer, and they became a foundational band for Alan McGee when he began to form Creation Records.

Mute Records
In the middle of 1980, the Television Personalities made their live debut following the recruitment of Joe Foster on bass and Mark Sheppard (known as Empire) on drums. This line-up was short-lived, reportedly due to differences in opinion between Foster and Sheppard, leading to Joe's departure. Prior to this, Dan and Mark helped out with Joe's solo project, the Missing Scientists, which included Mute Records head Daniel Miller.

The Television Personalities' first album ...And Don't The Kids Just Love It was released in 1981. It set the template for their subsequent career: neo-psychedelia married to an obsession with youth culture of the 1960s. Their second album Mummy Your Not Watching Me [sic] demonstrated increased psychedelic influences. Their third album, entitled They Could Have Been Bigger Than The Beatles showed Treacy's sense of humour; the TVPs were never to have any major commercial success in the UK – although their albums sold respectably in Germany, Sweden and the Netherlands. The first three albums featured Treacy and schoolmate Ed Ball; Ball left the band in 1982 to found The Times, but rejoined in 2004.

According to critic Ira Robbins, with their 1984 album The Painted Word the TVPs "have drifted off into spare, droning psychedelia and ultra-restrained rock that's hauntingly beautiful, like the most delicate moments of The Velvet Underground." The band were hired that year to support Pink Floyd guitarist David Gilmour on the tour for his solo album About Face, but were fired when they performed their song "I Know Where Syd Barrett Lives", during which Treacy read out Barrett's real address on stage.

Later years and revival
In 1983 the band comprised Treacy, Dave Musker on keyboards, Joe Foster on guitar and Mark Flunder on bass. Jeffrey Bloom joined on drums at a gig in Alan McGee's Living Room club and shortly afterwards Stephen Bird, AKA Jowe Head, replaced Flunder on Bass. This line up went on the band's first tour of Europe but shortly afterwards Foster and Musker left. This left the band as a guitar, bass and drums threesome and Treacy, Foster and Bloom would continue as the Television Personalities for the next 14 years. The band were regulars on the London gig scene and also did several tours of the UK, Europe, the U.S. and Japan. The Chocolate Art and Camping in France live albums were recorded during this time.

Various line-up changes and circumstances prevented the recordings for Privilege from being released until 1990. Their subsequent album Closer to God was a combination of sixties style pop and darker material, and was similar in tone to The Painted Word.

Treacy later struggled with mental health issues and drug addiction, and from 1998 to June 2004 was incarcerated for theft. He spent time on HM Prison ship Weare in Portland Harbour, Dorset, England. A gig at the Hanbury Ballroom, Brighton on 6 August 2005 ended in chaos after half an hour when Treacy had apparent difficulties with his guitars and mic stand. His bandmates left him on stage and the gig was halted by the management. His 2006 comeback album My Dark Places received widespread critical acclaim, including for the single "Velvet Underground". The NME described it as a "stunningly original record-harrowing and hilarious in equal amounts", while the BBC wrote that the album "captures the offbeat brilliance that made the TVPs indie legends in the 70s, characterised by Treacy’s endearingly slapdash attitude towards singing in tune and playing in time." He was reportedly seriously ill in October 2011 following brain surgery to remove a blood clot. He regained consciousness in December, but remained hospitalised. By 2016 he was recovering from the surgery and said that he intended to return to music.

In January 2018, Fire Records released the long lost Beautiful Despair as the band's twelfth album. It had been recorded in 1990 on a 4-track, between 1989's "Privilege" and 1992's "Closer to God", but was not released at that time.

Influence
Bands that have cited them as formative influences include Jesus and Mary Chain, Half Man Half Biscuit, The Pastels, Beat Happening, Tindersticks (who covered the song "You’ll Have To Scream Louder" in 2020), Pavement and MGMT (who recorded the track "Song for Dan Treacy").

Discography

Treacy is known for the numerous popular culture references and in-jokes scattered throughout the TVPs' lyrics, album titles and record artwork. Most of the references are to (mostly British) cult films, 1960s culture and forgotten or under appreciated musicians and celebrities.

Albums
The following is a complete list of the Television Personalities albums.
...And Don't the Kids Just Love It (1981, Rough Trade)
Mummy Your Not Watching Me (1982, Whaam! Records)
They Could Have Been Bigger than the Beatles (1982, Whaam! Records)
The Painted Word (1984, Illuminated Records)
Privilege (1989, Fire Records)
Closer to God (1992, Fire Records)
I Was a Mod Before You Was a Mod (1995, Overground Records)
Don't Cry Baby, It's Only a Movie (1998, Damaged Goods Records)
My Dark Places (2006, Domino)
Are We Nearly There Yet? (2007, Overground Records)
A Memory Is Better Than Nothing (2010, Rocket Girl)
Beautiful Despair (2018, Fire Records)

References

Sources
 Buckley, Peter. The Rough Guide to Rock. Rough Guides, 2003. 
 Cavanagh, David. The Creation Records Story: My Magpie Eyes Are Hungry for the Prize. London: Virgin Books, 2000.

External links
Official site: Treacy's web journal, live gig archive, photos, tour info
A Day in Heaven: An unofficial Television Personalities website
Alan McGee article in The Guardian
ARC magazine interview

Musical groups established in 1978
Musical groups disestablished in 2011
English indie rock groups
English new wave musical groups
English post-punk music groups
British mod revival groups
English psychedelic rock music groups
Rough Trade Records artists
English pop punk groups
Rocket Girl artists